Pernby's paint school , primarily Otte Skölds målarskola, in Stockholm was founded in 1929 by Otte Sköld (1894–1958) and Åke Pernby (1901–1981). The school was renamed in 1949, when Otte Skölds became head of the Nationalmuseum, and Åke Pernby was in charge as rector.

The school offers a two years training in painting and subscription, and prepares students for a higher education in Fine Arts.

Sources 
 Pernbys målarskola - en liten historik (Swedish), Narvatryck, Stockholm 2001

External links 
Official website

University-preparatory schools
Art schools in Sweden
Education in Stockholm
1929 establishments in Sweden